Blands is an unincorporated community in southwestern Durham County, North Carolina, on the intersection of North Carolina Highway 751 and Stagecoach Road, at an elevation of 236 feet (72 m).

References

Unincorporated communities in Durham County, North Carolina
Unincorporated communities in North Carolina